Buzzi Unicem S.p.A. is an Italian company, quoted on the Borsa Italiana, which produces cement, ready-mix concrete, and construction aggregates. Its headquarters are in the town of Casale Monferrato which was once known as the Italian ‘cement capital’. Today it has subsidiaries, interests and operations in Italy, Luxembourg, Germany, Algeria and Eastern Europe as well as in North America.

The company was formed in September 1999 when Buzzi Cementi (founded as Fratelli Buzzi SpA in Trino by the brothers Pietro and Antonio Buzzi in 1907) took over Unicem (founded as Cementi Marchino in Casale by Luigi Marchino in 1878), and took on the name Buzzi Unicem.

The company was founded by a large family connected to the successful Italian fencer, Lorenzo Buzzi.

Growth through acquisition 
In 2004 the group acquired control of the German cement company Dyckerhoff (founded as Portland-Cement-Fabrik Dyckerhoff & Söhne in Amöneburg by Wilhelm Gustav Dyckerhoff and his sons in 1864).  In March 2018, Buzzi Unicem acquired the German firm Portlandzementwerke Seibel & Söhne through the Dyckerhoff subsidiary.

In September 2018, Buzzi Unicem revealed that it had acquired 50% of Brazil's BCPAR (owned by Grupo Ricardo Brannand), which includes two cement plants in the country, with an option to acquire the rest of the firm by 2025.  This acquisition was made at a relatively low cost, likely at a loss for the seller, due to the precarious financial situation facing the Brazilian construction industry at the time.  In November 2018, Buzzi Unicem was one of thirty companies that formed the advocacy group Global Cement and Concrete Association, as a partial replacement for the Cement Sustainability Initiative.

 the company had sales in, at least, the Czech Republic, Germany (through Dyckerhoff), Italy, Luxembourg, Mexico, Netherlands, Poland, Russia, Slovakia, Ukraine, and the United States (through Buzzi Unicem USA).

Operations 
The current Chairman is Sandro Buzzi; Chief Executives are Pietro Buzzi (Corporate Finance) and Michele Buzzi (Operations management).

Buzzi Unicem was among several cement companies who in mid-2018 were fined tens-of-millions of Euros for cartel-like behavior in Italy, fines initially imposed in 2017 by the Italian Competition Authority and subsequently appealed.

In September 2017, the company bought a 50% stake in Ecotrade, a supplier of industrial byproducts (e.g. fly ash, slags), with the intent to expand its internal operations.

In mid-2017, Buzzi Unicem suffered a cyberattack which disrupted its internal process administration and delayed financial disclosures, thought to be due to the Petya ransomware virus likely infiltrating through plants that it operates in the Ukraine.

References

External links

Company listings at aggregators and portals
CemWeek
Yahoo Finance
Markets Insider

Companies listed on the Borsa Italiana
Cement companies of Italy
Manufacturing companies established in 1999
Casale Monferrato
Companies based in Piedmont
Italian companies established in 1999